Hubert Schieth (26 January 1927 – 19 February 2013) was a German football striker and manager.

Career

Statistics

References

External links
 

1927 births
2013 deaths
German footballers
Eintracht Frankfurt players
German football managers
VfL Bochum managers
Schwarz-Weiß Essen managers
2. Bundesliga managers
Schwarz-Weiß Essen players
Association football forwards